Krishi Darshan (English: Agriculture Vision) is an Indian television program which premiered on DD National. It premiered on 26 January 1967 and is the longest running television series in India. It is broadcast to 80 villages close to Delhi. In 2015, it was shifted from DD National to DD Kisan, but also airs on the former channel.

Theme
This programme aims at disseminating agricultural information to rural, farming audiences.

References

Further reading

External links
Krishi Darshan on DD Kisan
Krishi Darshan on YouTube

Agriculture in India
Television shows about agriculture
1967 Indian television series debuts
DD National original programming
1960s Indian television series
1970s Indian television series
1980s Indian television series
1990s Indian television series
2000s Indian television series
2010s Indian television series